Harold Huber (born Harold Joseph Huberman, December 5, 1909September 29, 1959) was an American actor who appeared on film, radio and television.

Early life
Huber was born in the Bronx to Jewish immigrants from Imperial Russia, who had arrived in the United States as infants. His father was the manager of an optical firm.  Harold Huberman entered New York University in the Fall of 1925 at age sixteen. He was a member of the university debate team, and by his third year had become editor of a school magazine called The Medley. His tenure at that post was marked by an incident, reported in the newspapers, when the administration suspended publication of The Medley in May 1928 for printing "low humor...not fit to bear the name of New York University".

After graduating from NYU in 1929, Huberman attended Columbia University for a short time, reportedly in the School of Law, but apparently dropped out after getting his first acting job in 1930.

Career

Stage 
On September 22, 1930, Harold Huberman became Harold Huber, for a Broadway adaption of A Farewell to Arms. This first acting job lasted a month. He also appeared in the Broadway productions The Assassin (1945), Merry-Go-Round (1932), Two Seconds (1931), and First Night (1930) before landing roles in some Warner Bros. films shot on location in New York.

Film 
Huber made his film debut in Central Park in late 1932, followed quickly by a bit part in 20,000 Years in Sing Sing.  He appeared in nearly 100 films in the 1930s and 1940s.  An early noteworthy role was as the stool-pigeon Nunnheim in The Thin Man (1934).  He played many roles requiring him to assume different accents, like Ito Nakamura, a Japanese American in the 1942 film Little Tokyo, U.S.A..  Among his many roles were appearances as a police officer in various Charlie Chan films, including an American in Charlie Chan on Broadway (1937), a French officer in Charlie Chan at Monte Carlo (1937) and Charlie Chan in City in Darkness (1939), and a Brazilian in Charlie Chan in Rio (1941).  He played a supporting role as a member of the French Foreign Legion in Beau Geste (1939). He also played roles in films featuring Mr. Moto and Charlie McCarthy.

Radio 
Huber starred as Hercule Poirot in The Adventures of M. Hercule Poirot in a weekly half-hour program from February to October, 1945 (the program is also cited as being titled simply Hercule Poirot or Agatha Christie's Poirot). Agatha Christie introduced the initial broadcast of the series via shortwave radio.  In October 1946, Huber began a year-long run on radio as Poirot in a daily fifteen-minute program on CBS, called Mystery of the Week, with scripts by Alfred Bester.  Huber also portrayed Fu Manchu on radio in an eponymous program.

Television 
Huber's television debut came in 1950, as the star of a weekly half-hour drama, I Cover Times Square, on ABC. He played Johnny Warren, a nationally known newspaper and radio columnist. Huber also produced the New York-made show, which lasted only one season.

Final role
In September 1958, Huber co-starred with Eva Gabor in a short-lived off-Broadway revival of Frank Wedekind's play Lulu, his last professional credit.

Personal life
Huber died during surgery at Jewish Memorial Hospital on September 29, 1959, leaving behind his wife Ethel and daughter Margaret.   He was buried at Mount Hebron Cemetery in Queens.

Selected filmography

 The Criminal Code (1930) - Convict in Yard (uncredited)
 Central Park (1932) - Nick Sarno
 20,000 Years in Sing Sing (1932) - Tony - Death Row Convict (uncredited)
 Frisco Jenny (1932) - Weaver
 The Match King (1932) - Scarlatti
 Parachute Jumper (1933) - Steve Donovan
 Ladies They Talk About (1933) - Lefty Simons
 Girl Missing (1933) - Jim Hendricks
 Central Airport (1933) - Swarthy Man (scenes deleted)
 The Life of Jimmy Dolan (1933) - Reggie Newman
 The Silk Express (1933) - Train Guard Craft
 The Mayor of Hell (1933) - Joe
 Midnight Mary (1933) - Puggy
 Mary Stevens, M.D. (1933) - Tony
 Police Car 17 (1933) - Johnny Davis
 The Bowery (1933) - Slick (uncredited)
 Fury of the Jungle (1933) - Gaston Labelle aka Frenchy
 Hi, Nellie! (1934) - Leo
 No More Women (1934) - Iceberg
 The Crosby Case (1934) - Rogers (uncredited)
 The Line-Up (1934) - 'Mile-a-Way' Miller
 A Very Honorable Guy (1934) - Joe Ponzetti
 He Was Her Man (1934) - J.C. Ward, Curly's Hitman
 The Thin Man (1934) - Nunheim
 The Merry Frinks (1934) - Benny Lopez
 The Defense Rests (1934) - Castro
 Beyond the Law (1934) - Gordon
 Hide-Out (1934) - Dr. Warner
 Port of Lost Dreams (1934) - Louis Constolos
 Cheating Cheaters (1934) - Edgar 'Legs' Finelli
 The World Accuses (1934) - 'Checkers' Fraley
 Forsaking All Others (1934) - Mr. Frankenstein - Hamburger Stand Owner (uncredited)
 One New York Night (1935) - Blake
 Naughty Marietta (1935) - Abe
 G Men (1935) - Venke
 Reckless (1935) - Nick Londos (uncredited)
 Mad Love (1935) - Thief (scenes deleted)
 Pursuit (1935) - Jake
 I Live My Life (1935) - Picture Hanger (uncredited)
 We're Only Human (1935) - Tony Ricci (uncredited)
 Muss 'em Up (1936) - Maratti
 Klondike Annie (1936) - Chan Lo
 San Francisco (1936) - Babe
 Kelly the Second (1936) - Spike
 Women Are Trouble (1936) - Pete the Pusher
 The Devil Is a Sissy (1936) - Willie
 The Gay Desperado (1936) - Juan Campo
 They Gave Him a Gun (1937)
 The Good Earth (1937) - Cousin
 Trouble in Morocco (1937) - Palmo
 Midnight Taxi (1937) - Walter 'Lucky' Todd
 Angel's Holiday (1937) - Bat Regan
 You Can't Beat Love (1937) - Pretty Boy Jones
 Outlaws of the Orient (1937) - Bandit General Ho-Fang
 Love Under Fire (1937) - Lieutenant Chaves
 Charlie Chan on Broadway (1937) - Inspector Nelson
 Charlie Chan at Monte Carlo (1937) - Jules Joubert
 International Settlement (1938) - Joseph Lang
 A Slight Case of Murder (1938) - Giuseppe
 Mr. Moto's Gamble (1938) - Lieutenant Riggs
 The Adventures of Marco Polo (1938) - Toctai
 A Trip to Paris (1938) - Willie Jones
 Gangs of New York (1938) - Panatella
 Passport Husband (1938) - Blackie Bennet
 Mysterious Mr. Moto (1938) - Ernst Litmar
 Little Tough Guys in Society (1938) - Uncle Buck
 While New York Sleeps (1938) - Joe Marco
 Going Places (1938) - Maxie
 Midnight Mary (1939)
 King of the Turf (1939) - Santelli
 You Can't Get Away with Murder (1939) - Tom Scappa
 The Lady and the Mob (1939) - Harry the Lug
 Chasing Danger (1939) - Carlos Demitri
 6,000 Enemies (1939) - Joe Silenus
 Beau Geste (1939) - Voisin
 Main Street Lawyer (1939) - Tony Marco
 Charlie Chan in City in Darkness (1939) - Marcel
 Charlie McCarthy, Detective (1939) - Tony Garcia
 The Ghost Comes Home (1940) - Tony
 Kit Carson (1940) - Lopez
 Dance, Girl, Dance (1940) - Hoboken Gent
 A Man Betrayed (1941) - Morris Slade
 Country Fair (1941) - Cash Nichols
 Charlie Chan in Rio (1941) - Chief Souto
 Down Mexico Way (1941) - Pancho Grande
 Pardon My Stripes (1942) - Big George Kilraine
 Sleepytime Gal (1942) - Honest Joe Kincaid
 A Gentleman After Dark (1942) - S. Jenkins (Stubby)
 Little Tokyo, U.S.A. (1942) - Ito Takimura
 Manila Calling (1942) - Santoro
 Lady from Chungking (1942) - Gen. Kaimura
 Ice-Capades Revue (1942) - Duke Baldwin
 Crime Doctor (1943) - Joe Dylan
 My Friend Irma Goes West (1950) - Pete
 Let's Dance (1950) - Marcel
 The Joker Is Wild (1957) - Harry Bliss (uncredited)

Radio appearances

References

Further reading
Ken Hanke, Charlie Chan at the Movies Jefferson, NC: McFarland, 1989. .

External links

 
 
 
 Listen to the Hercule Poirot radio program

1909 births
1959 deaths
Burials at Mount Hebron Cemetery (New York City)
Male actors from New York City
American male film actors
American male radio actors
American male television actors
20th-century American male actors
American people of Russian-Jewish descent
American people of Jewish descent